Steamboat Slough is an alternate branch of the Sacramento River, named for its popular use by steamboats traveling between San Francisco and Sacramento.

It is crossed by the Howard Landing Ferry.

References

Sacramento–San Joaquin River Delta